Roland Németh (born 19 September 1974 in Szombathely, Vas) is a Hungarian athlete specializing in the 100 metres.

He won the bronze medal at the 2002 European Championships in Athletics. Participating in the 2004 Summer Olympics, he achieved third place in his 100 metres heat, thus making it through to the second round. He finished sixth in the second round, thus failing to achieve qualification to the semi-finals.

Németh finished seventh with the Hungarian 4 x 100 metres relay team, which consisted of Viktor Kovács, Gábor Dobos, Németh and Zsolt Szeglet, at the 1999 World Championships.

He holds national record in 100 m, achieved in June 1999 in Budapest.

Personal best

External links

sports-reference

1974 births
Living people
Hungarian male sprinters
Athletes (track and field) at the 2004 Summer Olympics
Olympic athletes of Hungary
Sportspeople from Szombathely
European Athletics Championships medalists